The 52nd District of the Iowa House of Representatives in the state of Iowa.

Current elected officials
Todd Prichard is the representative currently representing the district.

Past representatives
The district has previously been represented by:
 Richard Norpel, 1971–1973
 Louis A. Peterson, 1973–1975
 Lyle Scheelhaase, 1975–1979
 Warren Johnson, 1979–1983
 Doris Ann Peick, 1983–1987
 Ron Corbett, 1987–1999
 Patrick Shey, 1999–2003
 Mary Lou Freeman, 2003–2007
 Gary Worthan, 2007–2013
 Todd Prichard, 2013–present

References

052